5-a-side football at the 2014 Asian Para Games were held in Seonhak Hockey Stadium, Incheon from October 19–23, 2014. There was 1 gold medals in this sport.

Medal summary

Medal table

Medalists

Results

Group stage

Goalscorers
4 goals

3 goals

2 goals

1 goal

References

External links
Medallists by Event
Goalscorers
Medal standings
Medallists
Match Report
Competition Summary

2014
2014 in Asian football
football
2014
2014–15 in Iranian football
2014 in South Korean football
2014 in Japanese football
2014 in Thai football
2014 in Chinese football